Regional anthems of Finland (Finnish: Suomen maakuntalaulut) are songs which were composed or later selected to be anthems of Finland's historical provinces and current regions. The best known regional anthems in Finland are Karjalaisten laulu (anthem of North Karelia and South Karelia) and Nälkämaan laulu (anthem of Kainuu).

List of regional anthems

References

Finnish patriotic songs